William A. Armstrong was a professional rugby league footballer who played in the 1920s.

Notable tour matches
William Armstrong played  in Wakefield Trinity's 3-29 defeat by Australia in the 1921–22 Kangaroo tour of Great Britain match at Belle Vue, Wakefield on Saturday 22 October 1921.

References

External links
Search for "Armstrong" at rugbyleagueproject.org

English rugby league players
Place of birth missing
Place of death missing
Rugby league hookers
Rugby league second-rows
Wakefield Trinity players
Year of birth missing
Year of death missing